"Girls Talk Boys" is a song by Australian pop rock band 5 Seconds of Summer, taken from the soundtrack of Ghostbusters: Answer the Call (2016). The song was written by John Ryan, Teddy Geiger, Ammar Malik, along with Ricky Reed, who also handled the song's production. "Girls Talk Boys" was released on 15 July 2016 and has charted in multiple countries, reaching a peak of 21 in Australia, 6 in Scotland, and 28 in the United Kingdom.

Composition
The song is written in the key of E minor with a common time tempo of 120 beats per minute. The vocals span from D4 to D6 in the song.

Music video
The official music video was released on 22 July 2016 and featured scenes from the Ghostbusters film. The video featured the band members in makeshift versions of costumes from the film. A spare car and props that resemble elements from the film were also used in the music video. As of May 2021, the music video has over 22 million views.

Track listing
Digital download
"Girls Talk Boys" – 3:36
Digital download
"Girls Talk Boys" (Stafford Brothers Remix) – 4:07

Personnel
Luke Hemmings – vocals
Michael Clifford – vocals, guitar 
Calum Hood – vocals, bass
Ashton Irwin – drums, vocals
Ricky Reed – production, bass, guitar, programming
John Ryan – vocals, bass
Teddy Geiger – additional vocals
Ammar Malik – additional vocals
Ethan Shumaker – engineer
Mark Winterburn - engineer
John Delf – engineer
Manny Marroquin – mixing
Chris Galland – assistant mixing engineer
Ike Schultz – assistant mixing engineer
Chris Gehringer – mastering

Source:

Charts

Certifications

Release history

References

External links

2016 songs
5 Seconds of Summer songs
2016 singles
Capitol Records singles
Songs written by John Ryan (musician)
Songs written by Teddy Geiger
Songs written by Ammar Malik
Songs written by Ricky Reed
Ghostbusters music